Events from the year 1457 in France:

Incumbents
 Monarch – Charles VII

Deaths
 22 September – Peter II, Duke of Brittany

References

1450s in France